The Snapdragon 747 is a British trailerable sailboat that was designed by Thames Structural Plastics, a division of Thames Marine, as a cruiser and first built in 1964.

The Snapdragon 747 is a development of the Snapdragon 24, with a modified rig and a new skeg-mounted rudder design.

Production
The design was built by Thames Marine in the United Kingdom, starting in 1964, but it is now out of production. By 1976 over 350 boats had been completed.

Design

The Snapdragon 747 is a recreational keelboat, built predominantly of glassfibre, with wood trim. It has a masthead sloop rig, a raked stem, a plumb transom, a skeg-mounted rudder controlled by a tiller and fixed twin keels or an optional fin keel. It displaces  and carries  of ballast.

The boat is fitted with a Japanese Yanmar YS 8 diesel engine for docking and manoeuvring.

The design has sleeping accommodation for four people, with a double "V"-berth in the bow cabin, an "L"-shaped settee in the main cabin and an aft quarter berth on the starboard side. The galley is located on the starboard side just aft of the bow cabin. The head is located just aft of the bow cabin on the port side.

Operational history
The boat is supported by an active class club, the Snapdragon, Mirage and Invaders Association.

See also
List of sailing boat types

References

External links

Keelboats
1960s sailboat type designs
Sailing yachts
Trailer sailers
Sailboat type designs by Thames Structural Plastics
Sailboat types built by Thames Marine